This is a list of caravanserais in Armenia.

Caravanserais

See also
 List of castles in Armenia
 List of monasteries in Armenia

References 

Caravanserais

Caravanserais